This is a list of members of the Victorian Legislative Assembly from 2014 to 2018.

 On 2 February 2015, the Nationals member for Gippsland South and former Deputy Premier of Victoria, Peter Ryan, resigned. Nationals candidate Danny O'Brien won the resulting by-election on 14 March 2015.
 On 3 September 2015, the Liberal members for South-West Coast (former Premier of Victoria Denis Napthine) and Polwarth (Terry Mulder) resigned. Liberal candidates Roma Britnell and Richard Riordan were elected at the resulting by-elections on 31 October for South-West Coast and Polwarth respectively.
 Melton MLA Don Nardella resigned from the Labor Party on 7 March 2017 and now sits as an independent.
 Northcote Labor MLA Fiona Richardson died on 23 August 2017. Greens candidate Lidia Thorpe won the resulting by-election on 18 November 2017.
 Morwell MLA Russell Northe resigned from the National Party on 28 August 2017 and now sits as an independent.

See also
 Women in the Victorian Legislative Assembly

References

Members of the Parliament of Victoria by term
21st-century Australian politicians
Victorian Legislative Assembly